The 1998 NCAA Division II women's basketball tournament was the 17th annual tournament hosted by the NCAA to determine the national champion of Division II women's  collegiate basketball in the United States.

Defending champions North Dakota defeated Emporia State in the championship game, 92–76, to claim the Fighting Sioux's second NCAA Division II national title. This would go on to be the second of three consecutive titles for North Dakota.

The championship rounds were contested in Pine Bluff, Arkansas.

Regionals

East - Philippi, West Virginia
Location: Rex Pyles Arena Host: Alderson-Broaddus College

Great Lakes - Evansville, Indiana
Location: Physical Activities Center Host: University of Southern Indiana

North Central - Grand Forks, North Dakota
Location: Hyslop Sports Center Host: University of North Dakota

Northeast - Albany, New York
Location: Activities Center Host: College of Saint Rose

South - Russellville, Arkansas
Location: Tucker Coliseum Host: Arkansas Tech University

South Atlantic - Florence, South Carolina
Location: Smith University Center Host: Francis Marion University

South Central - Emporia, Kansas
Location: William L. White Auditorium Host: Emporia State University

West - Seattle, Washington
Location: Royal Brougham Pavilion Host: Seattle Pacific University

Elite Eight - Pine Bluff, Arkansas
Location: Pine Bluff Convention Center Host: University of Arkansas at Pine Bluff

All-tournament team
 Jenny Crouse, North Dakota
 Mandy Arndtson, North Dakota
 Jaime Pudenz, North Dakota
 Jurgita Kausaite, Emporia State
 Aneta Kausaite, Emporia State
 Jennifer Barbson, Francis Marion

See also
 1998 NCAA Division II men's basketball tournament
 1998 NCAA Division I women's basketball tournament
 1998 NCAA Division III women's basketball tournament
 1998 NAIA Division I women's basketball tournament
 1998 NAIA Division II women's basketball tournament

References
 1998 NCAA Division II women's basketball tournament jonfmorse.com

 
NCAA Division II women's basketball tournament
1998 in sports in Arkansas